Shari Kasman is a multidisciplinary artist and writer based in her hometown, Toronto, Canada.

She is the creator of the guerilla art installation Bloordale Beach.

Education 
Kasman has a Bachelor of Fine Arts degree in Music from York University and a diploma in Music Performance in classical piano from McMaster University.

Career 
Kasman has been teaching piano since 2001.

In the 2010s, Kasman photographed and provided guided tours of Toronto's Galleria Mall. She created two photo books about the mall. Her related exhibit Memories of Galleria Mall was featured as part of the Scotiabank CONTACT Photography Festival in 2019.

Kasman co-created the large-scale guerilla art installation that became a community hub, Bloordale Beach, which was described as a vision for reclaiming public space and was the inspiration for music videos and other works of art.

In 2022, after failing to persuade the City of Toronto to address flooding in a bicycle lane on Bloor Street, Kasman named the location "Bloordale Pond". The same year, Kasman drew attention to the unused land on Brock Street, Toronto, by putting up unauthorised signs suggesting the location was "Parkdale Provincial Park".

Books 

Everything Life Has to Offer, published by Invisible Publishing, 2016, ISBN 9781926743844
Galleria: The Mall That Time Forgot, Photobook, 2018, ISBN 9781999483302
Goodbye, Galleria, 2019, ISBN 9781999483319
 Rocks Don't Move and Other Questionable Facts, 2021, ISBN 9781999483326

References

External links 

 Official website

Living people
Artists from Toronto
Writers from Toronto
The Royal Conservatory of Music alumni
McMaster University alumni
York University alumni
Canadian photographers
21st-century Canadian women artists
Year of birth missing (living people)